Boxing is a combat sport.

Boxing may also refer to:

Combat sports
Lethwei or Burmese boxing, a Burmese martial art
Muay Thai or Thai boxing, a Thai martial art
Kickboxing, a sporting martial art
Savate or French boxing, a French martial art
Sanda or Chinese boxing, a Chinese martial art
Musti-yuddha or Indian boxing, an Indian martial art
Chess boxing, a hybrid sport mixing elements from chess and boxing

Video games
Boxing (1980 video game), an Atari 2600 video game
Boxing (1981 video game), an Intellivision video game
Boxing (1990 video game), a Game Boy video game

Other
Boxing (computer science), a process of placing a primitive type within an object so that the primitive can be used as an object
Boxing County, in Shandong, China
Boxing Day, a holiday
"Boxing" (song), a Ben Folds Five song on their self-titled album from 1995
Boxing the compass, the act of naming all thirty-two points of the compass
Boxing, the act of packing items into boxes

See also
Boxer (disambiguation)
Pugilism (disambiguation)